Parmotrema soredioaliphaticum is a species of saxicolous lichen in the family Parmeliaceae. Found in South America, it was described as new to science in 1998. The holotype was collected in Cerro Colorado in northern Córdoba Province, Argentina, where it was found growing on a rock. It is a morph of the species Parmotrema alidactylatum with sorediate dactyls (finger-like protrusions with a powdery surface). Parmotrema soredioaliphaticum was reported from Bolivia in 2012.

See also
List of Parmotrema species

References

soredioaliphaticum
Lichen species
Lichens described in 1998
Lichens of Argentina
Lichens of Bolivia